is a private junior college in the city of Gifu, Gifu, Japan.

History 
Named after the 7th-century Prince Shōtoku, the college opened in April 1966 for women. It became coeducational in 1998.

See also
 Gifu Shotoku Gakuen University

External links 
  

Educational institutions established in 1966
Japanese junior colleges
Universities and colleges in Gifu Prefecture
Private universities and colleges in Japan
1966 establishments in Japan